Reid Gardner Generating Station was a 557 megawatt coal fired plant on  located near Moapa, Nevada. It was co-owned by NV Energy (69%) and California Department of Water Resources (31%).  The plant consisted of four units. The first three were 100 MW units and were placed into service in 1965, 1968 and 1976.  The fourth unit placed into service in 1983 produced . Three units of Reid Gardner were shut down in 2014; the fourth went in March 2017. The demolition of the plant was completed in 2019.

Controversy
Due to its location adjacent to the Moapa Band of Paiute Indians reservation and one of their communities, the plant had long been a concern over the health effects on the nearby residents.  As a result of several agreements to improve the air quality around the plant, the upgraded plant was ranked as one of the 10 cleanest coal plants in the US.

Concerns have also been expressed over particulates in the air as the plant can be upwind of the Grand Canyon and Bryce Canyon.  Both of these canyons are Class I areas which place limits on the amount of haze allowed.

Greenhouse Gas Emissions
Reid Gardner Station was a major emitter of carbon dioxide, the main greenhouse gas contributing to global warming. California's Department of Water Resources is planning to sell its stake in the plant, and purchase less carbon-intensive electricity as a part of its overall plan to reduce emissions mandated by California law (AB32, the Global Warming Solutions Act of 2006):
Electricity from the plant produces disproportionally high amounts of GHGs as compared to other SWP electricity generation sources. Emissions from Reid Gardner for electricity delivered to DWR have typically been over 1.5 million mtCO2e [million metric tonnes CO2 equivalents] per year (30%-50% of total DWR operational emissions). Between 1997 and 2007, the average emissions rate from Reid Gardner for electricity supplied to DWR has been 1.116 mtCO2e/MWh. This is more than twice the emissions rate associated with the general pool electricity from the integrated California market. (CA DWR 2012, page 54)

Waste
The coal ash from the plant is stored on site in a  landfill.

Notes

Coal-fired power stations in Nevada
Buildings and structures demolished in 2019
Buildings and structures in Clark County, Nevada
Energy infrastructure completed in 1965
Energy infrastructure completed in 1968
Energy infrastructure completed in 1976
Energy infrastructure completed in 1983
Former coal-fired power stations in the United States
Former power stations in Nevada